The Iroquois Stakes is a Grade III American Thoroughbred horse race for two-year-olds over a distance of  miles on the dirt scheduled annually in September at Churchill Downs in Louisville, Kentucky. The event currently offers a purse of $300,000.

History

The event was inaugurated on 6 November 1982 was won by the improving Highland Park who was having tenth start of his juvenile career and guided by  US Hall of Fame jockey Donald Brumfield by a margin of 6 lengths over the one mile distance in a time of 1:38.

The event is named for Iroquois, the first American horse to win the English Epsom Derby who in turn was named for the Native American tribe, the Iroquois.

In 1990 the event was classified as Grade III.

In 2013, the distance for the event was increased to  mile. In 2020 the event was decreased back to 1 mile.

The race opens the Road to the Kentucky Derby Prep Season.  The winner receives 10 points toward qualifying for the Kentucky Derby.The event is also a "Win and You're In" race in the Breeders' Cup Challenge series.

Records
Speed record
 1 mile: 1:35.01 – Harlan's Holiday (2001)
 miles: 1:43.58 – Dennis' Moment  (2019)

Margins
  lengths – Not This Time  (2016)

Most wins by a jockey
 4 – Pat Day (1985, 1990, 1997, 2002)

Most wins by a trainer
 4 – William I. Mott (1983, 1990, 1991, 2007)
 4 – Dale Romans (2013, 2016, 2019, 2020)

Most wins by an owner
 2 – William Lucas (1983, 1990)  
 2 – Claiborne Farm (1985, 1999) 
 2 – Stonestreet Stables (2006, 2010)
 2 – Albaugh Family Stables (2019, 2020)
 2 – WinStar Farm (2007, 2021)

Winners

See also
 Road to the Kentucky Derby
 List of American and Canadian Graded races

References

1982 establishments in Kentucky
Churchill Downs horse races
Flat horse races for two-year-olds
Graded stakes races in the United States
Grade 3 stakes races in the United States
Breeders' Cup Challenge series
Recurring sporting events established in 1982